The women's 200 metre freestyle event at the 2015 European Games in Baku took place on 25 and 26 June at the Aquatic Palace.

Results

Heats
The heats were started on 25 June at 09:50.

Semifinals
The semifinals were started on 25 June at 17:30.

Semifinal 1

Semifinal 2

Final
The final was held on 26 June at 18:35.

References

Women's 200 metre freestyle
2015 in women's swimming